Lee Kernaghan OAM (born 15 April 1964) is an Australian country music singer, songwriter and guitarist. Kernaghan has won four ARIA Awards and three APRA Awards, and has sold over two million albums, and as of 2021, has won 38 Golden Guitars at the Country Music Awards of Australia (second to Slim Dusty).

He was the 2008 Australian of the Year, in recognition of his support for rural and regional Australia. Kernaghan was the recipient of the Outstanding Achievement Award at the 2015 ARIA Awards, for Spirit of the Anzacs.

Biography

1965–1990: Early years
Lee Kernaghan was born on 15 April 1964 in Corryong, Victoria and is the son of country music singer and truck driver Ray Kernaghan. Lee spent his formative years growing up in the Riverina country of Southern New South Wales. His grandfather was a third generation drover of sheep and cattle.

In 1986, Kernaghan traveled to the United States to represent Australia at the Nashville 'Fan Fair' country music festival.

1990s 
In 1992, Kernaghan released "Boys from the Bush" which became his first number one on the country chart.  Kernaghan said "When Garth (Porter) and I first wrote 'Boys from the Bush' I had no idea it would ever be a hit. It was just a song about me and my mates, working on the land, going to the pub and tearing around in utes. I didn't think anyone would be that interested in us... we were just kids from the bush but Garth said 'this record (The Outback Club) has to be about your life and where you come from so we wrote that song and several others and before long I had a band and we were out on the road performing them live."

In May 1992, Kernaghan released The Outback Club. The album debuted at number 94 on the ARIA Charts. At the 1993 Country Music Awards of Australia (CMAA), the album won Album of the Year the ARIA Award for Best Country Album. The album re-entered the chart later peaking at number 58 in May 1994.

In August 1993, Kernaghan released his second studio album, Three Chain Road. The album again won the CMAA Album of the Year and the ARIA Award for Best Country Album.

In July 1995, Kernaghan released his third studio album, 1959, which peaked at number 9 on the ARIA Chart, becoming Kernaghan's first top ten album. The album won Kernaghan his third Album of the Year at the CMAA of 1996.

In February 1998, Kernaghan released his fourth studio album, Hat Town. The album peaked at number 7 on the ARIA Chart and won his fourth Album of the Year at the CMAA of 1999.

Kernaghan's fifth studio album was The Christmas Album in November 1998. The album peaked at number 31 on the ARIA chart.

2000s 
In January 2000, Kernaghan released his sixth studio album, Rules of the Road. This was followed by Electric Rodeo in July 2002 which won Album of the Year and Top Selling Album of the Year at the 2003 CMAA. Electric Rodeo peaked at number 5 on the ARIA chart.

Kernaghan was part of The Man from Snowy River: Arena Spectacular in 2002.

In October 2004, Kernaghan released his first greatest hits collection titled, The Big Ones: Greatest Hits Vol. 1. The album peaked at number 16 on the ARIA charts and was certified platinum.

In April 2006, Kernaghan released his eighth studio album, The New Bush. The album peaked at number 6 on the ARIA Charts and won Album of the Year and Top Selling Album of the Year at the 2007 CMAA.

In July 2007, Kernaghan released his ninth studio album, Spirit of the Bush. The album's title track peaked at number 11 on the ARIA singles chart, becoming Kernaghan's highest charting single. The song won three awards at the 2008 CMAA.

In November 2009, Kernaghan released his tenth studio album, Planet Country.

In 2009 Kernaghan was named the biggest hit-maker of the last twenty years on the Australian Country Tracks chart, beating musical greats from Australia and international.

2010s 
In September 2011, Kernaghan released his second greatest hits collection, Ultimate Hits. The album peaked at number 8 on the ARIA chart.

In October 2012, Kernaghan released his eleventh studio album, Beautiful Noise. The album peaked at number 9 on the ARIA chart.

During a visit to the Australian War Memorial (AWM) in 2013, Kernaghan's friend and AWM Director Dr. Brendan Nelson introduced Kernaghan to letters that were written by Australian service men and women during various wars dating back to the landing at Gallipoli during the First World War. These letters were held in the vaults at the AWM. The power of the letters affected Kernaghan deeply and the experience at the Australian War Memorial that day was the catalyst that saw these letters put to music in what would become the Spirit of the Anzacs (album) in March 2015. Upon release, the album peaked at number 1 on the ARIA charts, becoming Kernaghan's first chart topper. It was the highest selling Australian artist album for 2015.

2015 also saw the release of Kernaghan's first book, The Boy from the Bush, These Are My Songs, These Are My Stories.

In March 2017, Kernaghan released his fourteenth studio album, The 25th Anniversary Album. The album peaked at number 2 on the ARIA chart.

In 2019 Kernaghan released his fifteenth studio album, Backroad Nation with the title track staying four weeks at #1 on the country singles charts.

2020s 
In 2022 Kernaghan is set to celebrate his 30th anniversary as an artist. In January 2022, he released a 3-CD greatest hits collection titled The Very Best of Lee Kernaghan: Three Decades of Hits on 14 January 2022 which peaked at number 17 on the ARIA charts.

Personal life 
During July 2015, Kernaghan's music was played at anti-Islam rallies in Australia, without his permission. He responded that the use of his work should be "consistent with – and respectful of, the memory of ... [soldiers who] laid down their lives for the freedoms we have today." Fellow local artists, Jimmy Barnes, John Farnham and Mark Seymour, objected to the use of their material at those rallies.

Kernaghan married musician Robyn McElvie in 1999. They have two sons, Jet and Rock.

Business ventures 
For several years, Kernaghan owned the historic Great Western Hotel in Rockhampton, Queensland, after buying the pub in 2003 when it was placed into receivership after a downturn in trade and public liability concerns.  Kernaghan has described the time during which he owned the Great Western Hotel as one of the greatest periods of his life.

Discography

Studio albums

Collaboration albums

Live albums

Compilation albums

Video albums

Charting singles

Awards and nominations 
Kernaghan received the Order of Australia Medal in 2004.

In 2008, he was Australian of the Year, in recognition for his support of rural and regional Australia; his 'Pass the Hat Around' tours have raised more than a million dollars for rural communities during a challenging period of drought. He was presented with the award by Prime Minister Kevin Rudd.

AIR Awards 
The Australian Independent Record Awards (commonly known informally as AIR Awards) is an annual awards night to recognise, promote and celebrate the success of Australia's Independent Music sector.

|-
| AIR Awards of 2013
|Beautiful Noise
| Best Independent Country Album
| 
|-
| AIR Awards of 2018
|The 25th Anniversary Album
| Best Independent Country Album
| 
|-
| AIR Awards of 2020
|Backroad Nation
| Best Independent Country Album
| 
|-

ARIA Music Awards 
The ARIA Music Awards is an annual awards ceremony that recognises excellence, innovation, and achievement across all genres of Australian music. Kernaghan has won two awards from 14 nominations. Plus, he received the Outstanding Achievement Award in 2015.

|-
| 1993
| The Outback Club
| rowspan="10"| ARIA Award for Best Country Album
| 
|-
| 1994
| Three Chain Road
| 
|-
| 1995
| Country Crowd
| 
|-
| 1996
| 1959
| 
|-
| 2000
| Rules of the Road
| 
|-
| 2002
| Electric Rodeo
| 
|-
| 2006
| The New Bush
| 
|-
| 2010
| Planet Country
| 
|-
| 2013
| Beautiful Noise
| 
|-
| rowspan="4"| 2015
| Spirit of the Anzacs
| 
|-
| "Spirit of the Anzacs" (directed by Duncan Toombs)
| rowspan="1"| Best Video
| 
|-
| Garth Porter forSpirit of the Anzacs
| rowspan="1"| Producer of the Year
| 
|-
| Spirit of the Anzacs
| rowspan="1"| Outstanding Achievement Award
| 
|-
| 2017
| The 25th Anniversary Album
| rowspan="2"| Best Country Album
| 
|-
| 2019
| Backroad Nation
| 
|-

APRA Awards 
The APRA Awards are held in Australia and New Zealand by the Australasian Performing Right Association to recognise songwriting skills, sales and airplay performance by its members annually. Kernaghan has won four awards from nine nominations.

|-
| 1993
| "Boys from the Bush"
| Country Song of the Year
| 
|-
| 1996
| "1959"
| Most Performed Country Work
| 
|-
| 1999
| "Hat Town"
| Most Performed Country Work
| 
|-
| 2004
| "Way It Is"
| Most Performed Country Work
| 
|-
| 2007
| "New Bush"
| Most Performed Country Work
| 
|-
| 2008
| "Spirit of the Bush" (featuring Adam Brand and Steve Forde)
| Most Performed Country Work
| 
|-
| 2011
| "Planet Country"
| Country Work of the Year
| 
|-
| 2014
| "Flying with the King"
| Country Work of the Year
| 
|-
| 2020
| "Backroad Nation"
| Most Performed Country Work of the Year
| 
|-

Australian Roll of Renown 
The Australian Roll of Renown honours Australian and New Zealander musicians who have shaped the music industry by making a significant and lasting contribution to Country Music. It was inaugurated in 1976 and the inductee is announced at the Country Music Awards of Australia in Tamworth in January.

|-
| 2015
| Lee Kernaghan
| Australian Roll of Renown
|

Country Music Awards (CMAA) 
The Country Music Awards of Australia (CMAA) (also known as the Golden Guitar Awards) is an annual awards night held in January during the Tamworth Country Music Festival, celebrating recording excellence in the Australian country music industry. They have been held annually since 1973. Kernaghan has won thirty-eight Golden Guitar awards at the Tamworth Country Music Awards of Australia.

|-
| 1993 || "Boys from the Bush" || APRA Song of the Year || 
|-
| 1993 || The Outback Club || Album of the Year  || 
|-
| 1993 || "Boys from the Bush" || Male Vocalist of the Year  || 
|-
| 1994 || "Three Chain Road" || APRA Song of the Year || 
|-
| 1994 || Three Chain Road || Album of the Year  || 
|-
| 1994 || "Three Chain Road" || Male Vocalist of the Year  || 
|-
| 1994 || "Leave Him in the Longford"  (with Slim Dusty)  || Vocal Group or Duo of the Year || 
|-
| 1995 || Three Chain Road || Top Selling Album of the Year  || 
|-
| 1996 || 1959 || Album of the Year  || 
|-
| 1997 || 1959 || Top Selling Album of the Year  || 
|-
| 1997 || "A Bushman Can't Survive"  (with Tania Kernaghan)  || Vocal Collaboration of the Year || 
|-
| 1999 || Hat Town || Album of the Year  || 
|-
| 1999 || Hat Town || Top Selling Album of the Year  || 
|-
| 1999 || "Goondiwindi Moon" || Male Vocalist of the Year  || 
|-
| 1999 || "Changi Banjo" || Heritage Song of the Year  || 
|-
| 1999 || "Tough Job"  (with Colin Buchanan)  || Vocal Collaboration of the Year || 
|-
| 2003 || "Thank God I'm a Country Boy"  (with Josh Arnold)  || Vocal Collaboration of the Year || 
|-
| 2003 || Electric Rodeo || Album of the Year || 
|-
| 2003 || Electric Rodeo|| Top Selling Album of the Year  || 
|-
| 2005 || "Missin' Slim" || Heritage Song of the Year  (with Colin Buchanan) || 
|-
| 2007 || The New Bush || Album of the Year || 
|-
| 2007 || The New Bush || Male Artist of the Year || 
|-
| 2007 || The New Bush || Top Selling Album of the Year  || 
|-
| 2007 || "Close as a Whisper (The Gift)" || Heritage Song of the Year Close || 
|-
| 2008 || "Spirit of the Bush"  (with Adam Brand and Steve Forde)  || Vocal Collaboration of the Year || 
|-
| 2008 || "Spirit of the Bush"  (with Adam Brand and Steve Forde)  || Video of the Year || 
|-
| 2008 || "Spirit of the Bush"  (with Adam Brand and Steve Forde)  || Single of the Year || 
|-
| 2011 || Planet Country || Top Selling Album of the Year  || 
|-
| 2012 || "Channel Country Ground"  (with Dean Perrett)  || Ballad of the Year  || 
|-
| 2014 || Beautiful Noise || Top Selling Album of the Year  || 
|-
| 2014 || "Flying with the King" || Male Artist of the Year  || 
|-
| 2014 || "Flying with the King" || Single of the Year  || 
|-
| 2014 || "Flying with the King" || Video clip of the Year  || 
|-
| 2016 || "Spirit of the Anzacs"   (with Guy Sebastian, Jessica Mauboy, Jon Stevens, Amy & George Sheppard, Shannon Noll and Megan Washington)  || Vocal Collaboration of the Year || 
|-
| 2016 || "Spirit of the Anzacs"  (with Guy Sebastian, Jessica Mauboy, Jon Stevens, Amy & George Sheppard, Shannon Noll and Megan Washington)  || Video clip of the Year || 
|-
| 2016 || Spirit of the Anzacs || Top Selling Album of the Year  || 
|-
| 2018 || The 25th Anniversary Album || Top Selling Album of the Year  || 
|-
| 2020 || Backroad Nation || Top Selling Album of the Year ||

Mo Awards
The Australian Entertainment Mo Awards (commonly known informally as the Mo Awards), were annual Australian entertainment industry awards. They recognise achievements in live entertainment in Australia from 1975 to 2016. Lee Kernaghan won five awards in that time.
 (wins only)
|-
|rowspan="2"| 1992 
| Lee Kernaghan
| Country Performer of the Year 
| 
|-
| Lee Kernaghan
| Male Country Entertainer of the Year 
| 
|-
|rowspan="2"| 1993
| Lee Kernaghan
| Country Performer of the Year 
| 
|-
| Lee Kernaghan
| Male Country Entertainer of the Year 
| 
|-
| 1994 
| Lee Kernaghan
| Male Country Entertainer of the Year 
| 
|-

Music for a  New Generation Awards
The Music For A New Generation Awards are run by the Planet Country with Big Stu & MJ radio program and celebrate crossover country artist efforts each year. The awards have featured fan voting since 2016.

|-
| 2015
| Himself
| Australian Male Artist of The Year
| 
|-
| 2017
| Himself
| Australian Male Artist of The Year
| 
|-

Tamworth Songwriters Awards
The Tamworth Songwriters Association (TSA) is an annual songwriting contest for original country songs, awarded in January at the Tamworth Country Music Festival. They commenced in 1986. Lee Kernaghan has won three awards in that time.
 (wins only)
|-
|rowspan="2"| 1993
|rowspan="2"| "Boys from the Bush" by Lee Kernaghan and Garth Porter
| Contemporary Country Song of the Year
| 
|- 
| Country Song of the Year
| 
|-
| 1996
| "1959" by Lee Kernaghan
| Contemporary Country Song of the Year
| 
|-

References

External links 

1964 births
Living people
People from Corryong
APRA Award winners
ARIA Award winners
Australian country singers
Australian country singer-songwriters
Australian male musical theatre actors
Australian of the Year Award winners
Recipients of the Medal of the Order of Australia
Australian country guitarists
Australian male guitarists
Australian male singer-songwriters
Australian republicans